Whitwell-on-the-Hill is a village and civil parish in the Ryedale district, in the county of North Yorkshire, England. The civil parish population (including Crambe and Foston) at the 2011 Census was 311. It is near the A64 road.

The local parish church is dedicated to St John.

Langdale's 1822 Topographical Dictionary reports "a well of remarkably clear water, from which the town derives its name". The 1828 The New Yorkshire Gazetteer or Topographical Dictionary by Stephen Reynolds Clarke states that Whitwell is "6 miles S.W. from Malton [has] a singular well, the water of which is nearly the colour of milk, and from which the township derives its name."

References

External links

Villages in North Yorkshire
Civil parishes in North Yorkshire
Ryedale